Nightmare Alley is a 2021 neo-noir psychological thriller film co-written and directed by Guillermo del Toro, and based on the 1946 novel of the same name by William Lindsay Gresham. It is the second feature film adaptation of Gresham's novel, following the 1947 version. A co-production between Searchlight Pictures, TSG Entertainment, and Double Dare You Productions, the film stars Bradley Cooper as a charming and ambitious carnival worker with a mysterious past who takes big risks to boost his career. Cate Blanchett, Toni Collette, Willem Dafoe, Richard Jenkins, Rooney Mara, Ron Perlman, Mary Steenburgen, and David Strathairn also star.

Del Toro announced the film in 2017, and produced alongside J. Miles Dale and Cooper. Frequent collaborator Dan Laustsen was the cinematographer, and Nathan Johnson replaced Alexandre Desplat as its composer. Principal photography began in January 2020 in Toronto, Ontario, but was shut down in March 2020 due to the COVID-19 pandemic. Production resumed in September 2020 and concluded that December.

Nightmare Alley premiered at Alice Tully Hall in New York City on December 1, 2021, and was theatrically released in the United States on December 17, 2021, by Searchlight Pictures. The film received generally positive reviews from critics, who praised Del Toro’s direction, the cinematography, score, production design, and performances of Cooper and Blanchett, but criticized the runtime. It flopped at the box office, grossing a total of $39.6million worldwide against a $60million production budget. It received four nominations at the 94th Academy Awards, including Best Picture. A black-and-white version subtitled Vision in Darkness and Light was released in select cities starting on January 14, 2022.

Plot
In 1939, drifter Stan Carlisle watches a geek show in which a deranged man eats a live chicken. Moments later he obtains temporary work there which is followed by a job offer. He begins working with the clairvoyant act starring "Madame Zeena" and her alcoholic husband, Pete.

Stan becomes attracted to fellow performer Molly and asks her to leave the carnival with him, but she refuses. Madame Zeena and Pete use coded language and cold reading tricks, which Pete keeps in a secret book. After Pete teaches a couple of tricks to Stan, he warns him against using them to pretend to speak to the dead. He learns that the owner, Clem, hires troubled alcoholics to be his "geeks," then gives them opium-laced alcohol so that they stay. Pete continues to teach Stan how to perform as a mentalist.

One night, after Molly has begun to warm up to Stan, Pete asks Stan for alcohol and catches Pete looking through his book of tricks. The next morning, Pete is found dead. Stan saves the carnival using his cold reading skills to convince the sheriff not to close it. Molly agrees to leave the carnival with Stan, to whom Zeena has given Pete's book.

Two years later, Stan has successfully reinvented himself with a psychic act for the wealthy elite of Buffalo, with Molly as his assistant. Their relationship has deteriorated and Stan has become demanding. During a performance, their act is interrupted by psychologist Dr. Lilith Ritter, who attempts to expose the rigged act. Stan bests and humiliates Ritter with his cold reading skills. Stan also cold reads Judge Kimball. The judge offers to pay Stan for a private consultation to help him and his wife communicate with their dead son. Despite Molly's objections, Stan agrees.

Stan goes to meet with Ritter to exchange information: If he is truthful about his background, she will give him information on Kimball. During their session, she learns Stan may have killed Pete and also that his alcoholic father neglected him as a child. Madame Veena, Bruno and the Major come to visit Molly who is overjoyed, while Stan immediately asks how long they will be staying. Madame Veena claims to know from the cards that Stan is about to do a "spook show" and warns him not to.

Armed with Ritter's information, Stan performs a successful reading for Kimball. He offers to split the profits with Ritter but she refuses, agreeing to keep the money in her care to hide it from Molly. Stan informs Ritter that Kimball has offered to introduce him to Ezra Grindle, a former patient of Ritter's. She feeds Stan information about Grindle's past, namely how he forced an abortion on a young woman named Dorrie. Stan and Ritter begin a romantic relationship, and he begins drinking.

Stan continues to hold sessions with Grindle, who demands that Stan make Dorrie's spirit materialize in a séance. Stan agrees and plans to have Molly pose as Dorrie from afar. Meanwhile, Judge Kimball's wife murders her husband and commits suicide to be reunited with their son, whom Stan said was waiting for them. Molly initially refuses but relents with the promise of being able to leave Stan if she cooperates. During the act, Grindle realizes it is a scam; he hits Molly and threatens Stan. Stan beats Grindle to death and runs over Grindle's bodyguard with his car. Horrified, Molly leaves.

Stan arrives at Ritter's office to obtain his money, but she betrays him with depleted money rolls stuffed with dollar bills. Ritter blows off part of his ear with a pistol and taunts him. He attacks her but security arrives and he escapes. A flashback reveals he killed his father by intentionally exposing him to hypothermia before burning his house down.

As he descends into alcoholism and despair while traveling the hobo circuit, Stan sees ads touting Madame Zeena. Stan finds a new carnival, and as he talks to the owner he spies an embalmed freak-in-a-jar on his desk, and the owner explains he purchased it from the old carnival which Stan used to belong to, which had disbanded. Realizing he is not going to find Madame Zeena and Molly again, Stan desperately pitches his mentalist act to the carnival owner, who rejects it based on his unkempt appearance and the act being out of fashion. The owner then changes his mind and offers him a drink and temporary work as a geek, using the same language Clem used to lure alcoholics many years ago. Realizing his fate, Stan accepts the offer, tearfully telling the owner that he was "born for it" as he snaps and breaks down laughing.

Cast

In addition, Romina Power, daughter of actor Tyrone Power, who played Stanton in the 1947 film, has an uncredited cameo as a viewer of Stanton's show.

Production

Pre-production

The project was announced in December 2017, when Guillermo del Toro revealed that he would be attached to write and direct a film adaptation of William Lindsay Gresham's 1946 novel. The film marks a departure for del Toro, as it contains no supernatural elements, as opposed to his previous films. Del Toro considered this to be a standalone adaptation of Gresham's novel, as opposed to a remake of the 1947 film version starring Tyrone Power. He stated: "Well, what it is is that book was given to me in 1992 by Ron Perlman before I saw the Tyrone Power movie, and I loved the book. My adaptation that I've done with [co-writer] Kim Morgan is not necessarily—the entire book is impossible, it's a saga. But there are elements that are darker in the book, and it's the first chance I have—in my short films I wanted to do noir. It was horror and noir. And now is the first chance I have to do a real underbelly of society type of movie. [There are] no supernatural elements. Just a straight, really dark story." Del Toro also revealed the film would be aiming for an R-rating, saying: "big R. Double R!"

Dan Laustsen and Alexandre Desplat were announced to serve as the film's cinematographer and composer, respectively, both having previously collaborated with del Toro in The Shape of Water (2017).

Casting
In April 2019, Leonardo DiCaprio entered negotiations to star in the film. But by June 2019, Bradley Cooper entered early negotiations to replace DiCaprio. Del Toro stated that he and Cooper quickly connected with each other when del Toro met Cooper in Cooper's house to discuss the role: "We started talking script and then this started mirroring our thoughts about life and the way we viewed the world. We entered strange, darker times that led to 'Nightmare Alley' for me, and [changed the] way I view the world." Del Toro also believed that Cooper's experience as a director helped strengthen their connection, stating, "A director is an actor and an actor is a director. There is no separation of the craft... that took awhile for me to get used to. I normally create and guide these little Fabergé eggs of movies, obsessively detailed. All of a sudden we were on an adventure. I will never shoot a movie the same way." Del Toro further discussed his collaborative relationship with Cooper while filming:

In August 2019, Cate Blanchett was in negotiations to join the film. Both Cooper and Blanchett were confirmed to star the next month, along with the addition of Rooney Mara. Toni Collette and David Strathairn were added in September, with Strathairn replacing Michael Shannon who dropped out due to scheduling conflicts. Collette praised del Toro's capabilities as a director, and described the film as a "period drama" and "unlike some of his other work." Willem Dafoe was cast in October and Holt McCallany would join the next month. Ron Perlman and Richard Jenkins were both confirmed in January 2020. In February 2020, Mary Steenburgen and Romina Power, the daughter of Tyrone Power, joined the cast of the film. In March 2020, Paul Anderson joined the cast of the film.

Filming

Principal photography began in January 2020 in Toronto, Canada. Production temporarily moved to Buffalo, New York in February 2020, in order for del Toro to take advantage of the city's architecture and unfamiliar setting: "I wanted to find a city that was really interesting to visit for an audience, that was not a city they were overtly familiar with." Scenes were filmed in and outside of Buffalo's Niagara Square and City Hall, and required the use of fake snow, much to the surprise of the crew, as Buffalo is widely known for its heavy snowfall during the winter season.

Principal photography was initially set to begin in September 2019, but was delayed to accommodate Cooper's schedule. "We shot the second half before the first half," Cooper revealed. "We didn't want to do it that way. Things happened to us, with sets and other actors' availability and water, the snow and all that. I was the cause. I had moved to New York and said, 'I can't do it right now. Let me get settled.'" In March 2020, Del Toro himself shut down production on the film after rising concerns regarding the COVID-19 pandemic: "We stopped the shoot a week before [the industry shut down] [...] That saved us. Nobody to my knowledge in the cast or the crew got coronavirus." Del Toro later reflected that "Stopping was not mandatory back then, but we both felt if we don't stop now and someone gets sick — we said, 'we gotta stop.' Nobody was expecting it. Everybody went to lunch and came back six months later." Searchlight's parent, Walt Disney Studios, officially halted production on the film soon after.

Del Toro revealed that when production was shut down, approximately 45% of the film was shot, and he spent his time editing available footage during the hiatus. Del Toro also composed an 80-page safety precaution guideline to be used when production was to resume, which he was hoping to do in late 2020. Variety reported that Blanchett had completed her scenes prior to the shutdown.

Production resumed in September 2020 in Toronto. In an interview, Collette discussed some of the film's safety protocols: "[...] I've got to say, I think, you couldn't get any safer than a film set. They're so regimented and disciplined and demanding in terms of having to toe the line and everyone does their best to not get it. You really are in a bubble and the whole of Toronto is in masks and you're just sanitizing your hands a million times a day and trying not to be in big crowds and you just have to be mindful of that. Especially when you're working, because there's a bigger risk there. It's not just you, it's everyone else, you know?" Collette also revealed that del Toro had shot almost four hours of footage. By November 2020, principal photography was completed and re-shoots had commenced. Production officially wrapped in December 2020.

Del Toro and Cooper reflected that the unexpected shooting schedule benefited the film's structure. Del Toro remarked that "It was a blessing [...] I believe wholeheartedly life gives you what you need, not what you want. You have a window to look at everything. It was incredible. We got to see these characters, when [Stanton Carlisle] was full of himself and arrogant and certain and seeking. We were able to go back six months in between all this and were able to analyze and see not only that character but what we needed to rewrite to be able to go back to a set. If your pores are open, the movie finds you. Each movie tells you what it needs." Cooper further stated that "This movie needed that rigor. Thank god we had that time. As simple a story is, it demanded all our concentration and focus, all that time. I don't think we realized how much it demanded of us at the beginning. That was the discovery. There is arrogance. You think you can do it, then, 'how is this possible?'"

Cooper further reflected on his relationship with del Toro over the course of filming:

Music

Due to scheduling conflicts, Desplat exited the film, resulting in Nathan Johnson being brought in as replacement.

Release
It had its world premiere at the Alice Tully Hall in New York on December 1, 2021, accompanied by simultaneous screenings at the Academy Museum of Motion Pictures in Los Angeles and the TIFF Bell Lightbox in Toronto. The film was theatrically released on December 17, 2021, after having been rescheduled from its original release date of December 3, 2021.

On December 17, 2021, the day of the film's release, Searchlight Pictures announced that a black-and-white version of the film, titled Nightmare Alley: Vision in Darkness and Light, would be released the following month, on January 14, 2022, in select theaters in Los Angeles only, for up to 6 days. In January 2022, following the success of the showings, the version was announced to be broadening to other select cities. The black-and-white film expanded to 1,020 theaters nationwide on January 28, 2022.

The film was released on the streaming services Hulu and HBO Max on February 1, 2022 and on Ultra HD Blu-ray, Blu-Ray and DVD on March 22, 2022, by 20th Century Studios Home Entertainment.

By March 20, 2022, the film had been streamed on HBO Max and Hulu in a combined 3.1 million households in the United States according to Samba TV, including 2.1 million since the Oscar nomination announcements on February 8, the highest total of any Best Picture nominee.

Reception

Box office 
Nightmare Alley grossed $11.3million in the United States and Canada, and $28.2million in other territories for a worldwide total of $39.6million.

Nightmare Alley made $225,000 from Thursday night previews and an estimated $1.19 million by Friday. Its low opening was attributed to it being primarily meant for the audiences in the older age ranges (who had avoided going out to see movies amidst the COVID-19 pandemic), low interest among the movie-going audience, and the release of Spider-Man: No Way Home on the same date. It went on to debut to $2.8 million during the weekend, finishing fifth at the box office. Men made up 56% of the audience during its opening, with those in the age range of 25–54 composing 55% of ticket sales and those above 45 composing 29%. The ethnic breakdown of the audience showed that 63% were Caucasian, 11% Hispanic and Latino Americans, 9% African American, and 17% Asian or other. In its second weekend, the film earned $1.2 million. In its third, the film dropped out of the box office top ten, finishing eleventh with $966,875.

Critical response 
 Metacritic, which uses a weighted average, assigned a score of 70 out of 100 based on 55 critics, indicating "generally favorable reviews". Audiences polled by CinemaScore gave the film an average grade of "B" on an A+ to F scale, while those at PostTrak gave it a 72% positive score, with 49% saying they would definitely recommend it.

Mark Kermode of The Observer gave the film 5 out of 5, writing: "From its bruised colour palette to its spiralling descent into madness and degradation, this is deliciously damnable fare, looking back through the prism of Del Toro's adventurous oeuvre to the existential angst of his vampiric feature debut, Cronos." Linda Marric of The Jewish Chronicle also gave 5 out of 5, writing: "Del Toro employs a mixture of stylish old Hollywood sensibilities with B movie tropes to bring us an engaging and gorgeously acted psychological thriller." Clarisse Loughrey of The Independent also gave the film 5 out of 5, writing: "Del Toro can do worldbuilding in his sleep, but you might also find Cooper's brittle performance, filled with such elemental sadness, hard to shake off. Nightmare Alley is the shadow that lingers." Peter Bradshaw of The Guardian gave the film 4 out of 5, praising it as "a spectacular noir melodrama boasting gruesomely enjoyable performances and freaky twists."

Robbie Collin of The Daily Telegraph was more critical, giving the film 2 out of 5 stars and describing it as "an act of origami-level homage: it's all folded together in impressively fiddly ways, but the result is an angular, inert approximation, lacking in the original's breath or heat." Kevin Maher of The Times also gave the 2 out of 5 stars, praising its set design, but added: "there's little else in this drastically overstretched narrative (150 minutes!) to hold any attention beyond a cursory awareness that, yes, we’re watching an oddly literal melodrama about bad people doing very bad things, very slowly."

Martin Scorsese authored an essay in the Los Angeles Times urging readers to seek out the film, crediting Del Toro's films as being "lovingly and passionately crafted" and arguing that Nightmare Alley is "truer to the animating spirit of film noir than the many 'homages' that have been made over the years and are still being made now."

Accolades

References

External links
 
  for Vision of Darkness and Light version
 
 Official screenplay

2021 films
2021 psychological thriller films
2020s English-language films
American psychological thriller films
American neo-noir films
Canadian thriller films
Circus films
Film productions suspended due to the COVID-19 pandemic
Films based on American novels
Films directed by Guillermo del Toro
Films produced by Bradley Cooper
Films produced by Guillermo del Toro
Films scored by Nathan Johnson (musician)
Films set in 1939
Films set in 1941
Films set in 1942
Films shot in Buffalo, New York
Films shot in Toronto
Films with screenplays by Guillermo del Toro
Mexican thriller films
Searchlight Pictures films
TSG Entertainment films
2020s American films
2020s Mexican films
Films about alcoholism